The Chicago Unions were a professional, black baseball team that played in the late 19th century, prior to the formation of the Negro leagues.

Founding 

Organized as the Unions in 1887, the club was led by Abe Jones (1887–1889) and by W.S. Peters (1890–1900). In 1899 they lost a series for the western championship to the Columbia Giants, also based in Chicago.

The Unions, along with the Cuban Giants, are the only Negro teams to survive the political and economic crisis  that eventually lead to the Panic of 1893.  Every other significant Negro team which operated prior to the Panic ultimately ceased to exist. (Holway, p.30)

Merge 

During  and 1902, Frank Leland created the Chicago Union Giants by hiring many players from the Chicago Unions and Columbia Giants. The Union Giants "were recognized as the top team in the West, but lost a challenge playoff to the Algona Brownies in 1903 for the western championship" (Riley 168).

Franchise continuum

References

Negro league baseball teams
Unions
Defunct baseball teams in Illinois
Baseball teams disestablished in 1900
Baseball teams established in 1887